This is the list of Asian youth records in Olympic weightlifting. Records are maintained in each weight class for the snatch lift, clean and jerk lift, and the total for both lifts by the Asian Weightlifting Federation (AWF).

Current records

Men

Women

Historical records

Men (1998–2018)

Women (1998–2018)

References 

Asian, youth
Weightlifting in Asia
Under-20 sport
Weightlifting youth